Route 320 is a collector road in the Canadian province of Nova Scotia.

It is located in Richmond County and connects Louisdale at Exit 46 on Highway 104 with Arichat at Route 206 .

It crosses the Lennox Passage using the Burnt Island Bridge (a drawbridge) that connects Cape Breton Island to Isle Madame.

Communities

 Arichat
 D'Escousse
 Poulamon
 Martinique
 Lennox Passage
 Louisdale

Parks
Pondville Provincial Park
Lennox Passage Provincial Park

History

The section of Collector Highway 320 from Arichat to Harbourview Crescent was once designated as Trunk Highway 20.

See also
List of Nova Scotia provincial highways

References

Map of Nova Scotia

Nova Scotia provincial highways
Roads in Richmond County, Nova Scotia